Greg or Gregory Gibson may refer to:

Greg Gibson (wrestler) (born 1953), American wrestler
Greg Gibson (umpire) (born 1968), umpire in Major League Baseball
Gregory Gibson, American author
Gregory Gibson (scientist) (born 1963), geneticist at the Georgia Institute of Technology